Percival Garner III (born December 13, 1988) is an American former professional baseball pitcher who played in Major League Baseball (MLB) for the Cleveland Indians in 2016.

College career
Perci was a three-sport athlete while attending Dover High School in Dover, Ohio, where he played basketball, football, and baseball. He enrolled at Ball State University to play college football, but only saw two snaps at quarterback in his redshirt freshman season. At the urging of football coach Stan Parrish, Perci tried out for the college baseball team. Garner played two seasons for Ball State. As a redshirt freshman, Perci had a 4.95 ERA across 20 innings in 17 games. The following year, Perci led the team in strikeouts (83) while compiling a 4.62 ERA and a 5-3 record as a starter, earning him First Team All-Mid-American Conference honors.

Professional career

Philadelphia Phillies
Garner was drafted by the Philadelphia Phillies in the second round of the 2010 Major League Baseball Draft. He spent 2010 and 2011 with the Williamsport Crosscutters, and played sparingly. In 2012, Garner was promoted to the Clearwater Threshers, where he had a 7-9 record and a 4.84 ERA in 26 starts. He followed that up with a 6-6 record and a 4.30 ERA in 22 starts for Clearwater, while also having shorts stints with the Reading Fightin Phils and the Lehigh Valley IronPigs. He then split time between Clearwater and Reading in 2014 before being released.

Cleveland Indians
Prior to the 2015 season he signed a minor league contract with the Cleveland Indians, who converted him from a starting pitcher to a relief pitcher. During the 2015 season, Perci pitched solely for the Lynchburg Hillcats posting a record of 3-1 with a 2.93 ERA in 18 appearances. In 2016, Perci compiled a combined 7-1 record and 1.83 ERA in a total of 41 appearances with the Akron RubberDucks and the Columbus Clippers before making his major league debut in August.

Garner was called up to the major leagues by Cleveland for the first time on August 31, 2016, and made his debut that same day. During his time with the Indians in 2016, he appeared in 8 games compiling a record of 0-0 and a 4.82 ERA.

The Indians designated Garner for assignment on July 31, 2017, in order to make room on their 40-man roster for Joe Smith. The Indians re-signed Garner to a minor league contract on August 10, 2017.

Baltimore Orioles
He elected free agency on November 6, 2017, and signed a minor league contract with the Baltimore Orioles on November 30. He was released on June 6, 2018.

References

External links

Ball State Cardinals bio

1988 births
Living people
People from Dover, Ohio
Baseball players from Ohio
Major League Baseball pitchers
American football quarterbacks
Cleveland Indians players
Ball State Cardinals baseball players
Ball State Cardinals football players
Williamsport Crosscutters players
Clearwater Threshers players
Reading Fightin Phils players
Lehigh Valley IronPigs players
Lynchburg Hillcats players
Scottsdale Scorpions players
Akron RubberDucks players
Columbus Clippers players